NGC 112 is a barred spiral galaxy located in the constellation Andromeda. It was discovered by American astronomer Lewis Swift on September 17, 1885. The galaxy lies approximately 295 million light-years from Earth, and is about 75,000 light-years in diameter.

References

External links
 
 

0112
Barred spiral galaxies
Andromeda (constellation)
00255
001654
Astronomical objects discovered in 1885
Discoveries by Lewis Swift